4-D Warriors (4Dウォリアーズ) is a horizontally scrolling shooter arcade video game developed by Coreland and released by Sega in 1985.

Gameplay

The player takes control of a jetpack-propelled space warrior who travels between parallel universes and worm holes (hence 4-D or 4 dimensions) throughout the game. Flying over the top of the play field will transport the player to an alternate universe. The player can travel back and forth defeating enemies until they reach a boss creature. On some occasions a worm hole will appear in the middle of the play field and the player is taken to even stranger worlds.

References
4-D Warriors at Shmup.com

4-D Warriors at Arcade History

1985 video games
Arcade video games
Arcade-only video games
Sega System 1 games
Horizontally scrolling shooters
Sega arcade games
Video games developed in Japan
Banpresto games